Kentucky Route 2872 (KY 2872) is a  state highway entirely within Madison County in the U.S. state of Kentucky. The road is known as Duncannon Lane for its entire length and has an interchange with Interstate 75 (I-75) at exit 83.

Major intersections

2872
Transportation in Madison County, Kentucky

External links